The National Garage in Kansas City, Missouri is a building from 1930. It was listed on the National Register of Historic Places in 2000. It was demolished in 2004.

References

Commercial buildings on the National Register of Historic Places in Missouri
Buildings and structures completed in 1930
Buildings and structures in Kansas City, Missouri
National Register of Historic Places in Kansas City, Missouri
Buildings and structures demolished in 2004
Demolished buildings and structures in Missouri